Best of Live may refer to:

 Best of Live (Bajaga i Instruktori album), 2002
 Best of Live (Johnny Clegg album), 2003
 Best of Live (Last Exit album), 1990
 Best of Live (1996–2005), an album by Kraljevski Apartman, 2005
 Best of Night Ranger Live, an album by Night Ranger, 2005

See also
Awake: The Best of Live, an album by Live, 2004